Abdou Faye is a Senegalese boxer. He competed in the men's featherweight event at the 1972 Summer Olympics. At the 1972 Summer Olympics, he lost to Michael Andrews of Nigeria.

References

External links
 

Year of birth missing (living people)
Living people
Senegalese male boxers
Olympic boxers of Senegal
Boxers at the 1972 Summer Olympics
Place of birth missing (living people)
Featherweight boxers